Welcome to Switzerland is a 2004 French-Swiss comedy film directed by Léa Fazer. It was screened in the Un Certain Regard section at the 2004 Cannes Film Festival.

Cast
 Vincent Perez as Aloïs Couchepin
 Emmanuelle Devos as Sophie
 Denis Podalydès as Thierry
 Walo Lüönd as Adolf Sempach
 Marianne Basler as Béatrice

References

External links

2004 films
2004 comedy films
2004 directorial debut films
2000s French-language films
Films directed by Léa Fazer
Films set in Switzerland
French comedy films
Swiss comedy films
French-language Swiss films
2000s French films